Toni LP Kelner is an author of three mystery series:  the eight Laura Fleming novels and related short stories; the Where Are They Now? series, which includes three novels and a forthcoming short story; and the Family Skeleton series, which consists of six books with a seventh forthcoming. She has also edited seven urban fantasy anthologies with Charlaine Harris.  Many Bloody Returns, Wolfsbane and Mistletoe, and Home Improvement: Undead Edition were on the extended New York Times best seller list, and Death's Excellent Vacation debuted at #8 on the NYT list.  Kelner has written a number of short stories in anthologies and magazines.  Her most recent is "Now Hiring Nasty Girlz".

Kelner's short fiction has been nominated for the Agatha, the Anthony, the Macavity, and the Derringer awards, and her story "Sleeping With the Plush" won the Agatha for Best Short Story of 2006.  Her novels have been nominated for several RT BOOKclub awards, and Kelner won an RT BOOKclub Career Achievement Award.

Bibliography

Laura Fleming 

Down Home Murder (June 1993)
Dead Ringer (February 1994)
Trouble Looking for a Place to Happen (March 1995)
Country Comes to Town (September 1996)
Tight as a Tick (January 1998)
Death of a Damn Yankee (August 1999)
Mad as the Dickens (October 2001)
Wed and Buried (February 2003)

Where Are They Now? 

Curse of the Kissing Cousins (originally published as Without Mercy) (May 2009)
Who Killed the Pinup Queen? (January 2010)
Blast from the Past (February 2011)

A Family Skeleton Mystery 
published as Leigh Perry

A Skeleton in the Family (September 2013)
The Skeleton Takes a Bow (September 2014)
The Skeleton Haunts a House (October 2015)
The Skeleton Paints a Picture (October 2017)
The Skeleton Makes a Friend (October 2018)
The Skeleton Stuffs a Stocking (September 2019)

Anthologies and collections

References

External links
 Official web site
 

Agatha Award winners
Women mystery writers
Living people
Year of birth missing (living people)